Framingham, Massachusetts, has 18 locations listed on the National Register of Historic Places.

Current listings

|}

References

 
Framingham
 Framingham
Framingham, Massachusetts